(For the other Icelandic island named Geirfuglasker, located near the (Reykjanes) peninsula, please see Geirfuglasker)

Geirfuglasker ("great auk skerry") or Freykja  is a small island in the Vestmannaeyjar archipelago.

Vestmannaeyjar
Islands of Iceland